The Bengal Institute of Technology Katwa (BIT Katwa) is a polytechnic college established in 1993 by the Government of West Bengal. Recognized as one of the best among the polytechnic colleges of West Bengal the institute mainly offers diploma level courses in the fields of Automobile Engineering, Computer Science and Technology, Electronics and Telecommunication Engineering and Information Technology.

As a part of the "Technical Education Development Project" by the Government of West Bengal, the institute was established to train junior level engineers for the fulfillment of industrial demands. The institute shares its organisational structure and admission process with West Bengal State Council of Technical Education. BIT Katwa has a lush green campus located just 4 km away from Katwa rail station on SH-15(Katwa Burdwan Road). The students and alumni of the college are informally referred to as BITians.

Academics

Admission Procedure 
Admission in the first year (regular entry) and second year (lateral entry) to the diploma courses are based on the merit list of JEXPO and VOCLET exam respectively conducted by West Bengal State Council of Technical Education.

Education

Diploma Education 
BIT Katwa offers Diploma Engineering in the fields of:
 Information Technology
 Computer Science and Technology
 Electronics and Telecommunication Engineering
  Automobile Engineering
Diploma Engineering is the most common undergraduate program offered by the institute. It is a three-year based program with six semesters
 The first year (Semester 1 and 2) of the curriculum has common courses from various departments.
 From the second year (Semester 3 to 6) the students take courses offered by their respective departments.
 At the end of the fifth semester, students undertake industrial training as part of the curriculum.
 In the final year of their studies, most of the students are offered jobs in industries and other organisations through the Training and Placement section of the institute. Some students opt out of this facility in favor of higher studies or by applying to recruiting organisations directly.

Vocational Education 
The institute offers vocational (10+2) studies in the branch of:
 Automobile
 Electronics

Departments

Cells 
 Training and Placement Cell
 Anti-Ragging Cell

Library 
The second campus of the institute provides library facilities to all students. A huge collection of books, journals, and a collection of documents such as patents, standards, technical reports and pamphlets are available for the students. The library also provides access to different magazines and newspapers.

Campus 
Designed as a residential educational institute BIT Katwa is situated at Jagigram Industrial Complex on SH-15, just 4 km away from Katwa town. The institute is mainly divided in two campuses.

Main Campus 
 Main Building - Principal's Office, Administrative Departments
 Department of Electronics and Telecommunication Engineering
 Center for Vocational Studies

Second Campus 
 Department of Automobile Engineering
 Department of Computer Science and Technology
 Department of Information Technology
 Department of Science and Humanities
 Library
 Workshop
 Auditorium
 Hostels
 Canteen
 Sports area

Student life

Hall of residence 
The institute provides in campus separate hostel facilities for 1st year, 2nd year, 3rd year students (boys) in the second campus. Though the choice of residency is not mandatory.

No campus accommodation is available for the female students.

Extracurricular 
The second campus of the institute provides cricket, football, and volleyball court along with different indoor gaming options for all students. Other than that special gaming facilities are provided exclusively for the students residing in the campus hostels.

References

Technical universities and colleges in West Bengal
1988 establishments in West Bengal
Educational institutions established in 1988